Monroe is a city in and the county seat of Union County, North Carolina, United States. The population increased from 32,797 in 2010 to 34,551 in 2020. It is within the rapidly growing Charlotte metropolitan area.  Monroe has a council-manager form of government.

History

Monroe was founded as a planned settlement. In 1843, the first Board of County Commissioners, appointed by the General Assembly, selected an area in the center of the county as the county seat, and Monroe was incorporated that year. It was named for James Monroe, the country's fifth president. It became a trading center for the agricultural areas of the Piedmont region, which cultivated tobacco.

Monroe was home to the Starlite Speedway in the 1960s to 1970s. On May 13, 1966, the 1/2 mile dirt track hosted NASCAR's 'Independent 250.' Darel Dieringer won the race.

Since 1984, Ludwig drums and timpani have been manufactured in Monroe.

As part of the developing Charlotte metropolitan area, in the 21st century, Monroe has attracted new Hispanic residents. North Carolina has encouraged immigration to increase its labor pool.

The Malcolm K. Lee House, Monroe City Hall, Monroe Downtown Historic District, Monroe Residential Historic District, Piedmont Buggy Factory, John C. Sikes House, Union County Courthouse, United States Post Office, and Waxhaw-Weddington Roads Historic District are listed on the National Register of Historic Places.

Civil rights struggle
Racial segregation established by a white-dominated state legislature after the end of the Reconstruction era, persisted for nearly a century into the 1960s. Following World War II, many local blacks and veterans, including Marine veteran Robert F. Williams, began to push to regain their constitutional rights after having served the United States and the cause of freedom during the war. This would come to be met with some resistance. During this time, the city had a population estimated at 12,000; the press reported an estimated 7,500 members of the Ku Klux Klan gathering in the city, many coming from South Carolina, being only 14 miles from the state border.

Williams was elected as president of the local chapter of the NAACP; the National Association for the Advancement of Colored People had been founded in the early 1900s. He began to work to integrate public facilities, starting with the library and the city's swimming pool, which both excluded blacks. He noted that not only did blacks pay taxes as citizens that supported operations of such facilities, but they had been built with federal funds during the Great Depression of the 1930s.

In 1958 Williams hired Conrad Lynn, a civil rights attorney from New York City, to aid in defending two African-American boys, aged nine and seven. They had been convicted of "molestation" and sentenced to a reformatory until age 21 for kissing a white girl their age on the cheek. This became known as the Kissing Case. The former First Lady, Eleanor Roosevelt, talked to the North Carolina governor to urge restraint, and the case became internationally embarrassing for the United States. After three months, the governor pardoned the boys.

During the civil rights movement years of the 1960s, there was rising in Ku Klux Klan white violence against the minority black community of Monroe. Williams began to advocate black armed self-defense. Groups known as the Deacons for Defense, were founded by other civil rights leaders in Louisiana and Mississippi.

The NAACP and the black community in Monroe provided a base for some of the Freedom Riders in 1961, who were trying to integrate interstate bus travel through southern states. They had illegally imposed segregation in such buses in the South, although interstate travel was protected under the federal constitution's provisions regulating interstate commerce. Mobs attacked pickets marching for the Freedom Riders at the county courthouse. That year, Williams was accused of kidnapping an elderly white couple, when he sheltered them in his house during an explosive situation of high racial tensions.

Williams and his wife fled the United States to avoid prosecution for kidnapping. They went into exile for years in Cuba and in the People's Republic of China. In 1969 they finally returned to the United States, after Congress had passed important civil rights legislation in 1964 and 1965. The trial of Williams was scheduled in 1975, but North Carolina finally reviewed its case and dropped the charges against him.

The Jesse Helms family was prominent among the white community during these years. Jesse Helms Sr. served as Police and Fire Chief of Monroe for many years. Jesse Helms, Jr. was born and grew up in the town, where whites were Democrats in his youth. He became a politician and was elected to five terms (1973–2003) as a U.S. Senator from North Carolina, switching to the Republican Party as it attracted conservative whites. He mustered support in the South, and played a key role in helping Ronald Reagan to be elected as President of the United States. Through that period, he was also a prominent (and often controversial) national leader of the Religious Right wing of the Republican Party. The Jesse Helms Center is in neighboring Wingate, North Carolina.

Geography

Demographics

2020 census

As of the 2020 United States census, there were 34,562 people, 11,482 households, and 8,657 families residing in the city.

2010 census
As of the census of 2010, there were 32,797 people, 9,029 households, and 6,392 families residing in the city. The population density was 1,067.5 people per square mile (412.2/km2). There were 9,621 housing units at an average density of 391.6 per square mile (151.2/km2). The racial makeup of the city was 60.12% White, 27.78% African American, 0.44% Native American, 0.65% Asian, 0.03% Pacific Islander, 9.37% from other races, and 1.60% from two or more races. Hispanic or Latino of any race were 21.39% of the population.

There were 9,029 households, out of which 33.7% had children under the age of 18 living with them, 49.0% were married couples living together, 15.9% had a female householder with no husband present, and 29.2% were non-families. 23.3% of all households were made up of individuals, and 8.3% had someone living alone who was 65 years of age or older. The average household size was 2.83 and the average family size was 3.27.

In the city, the population was spread out, with 26.9% under the age of 18, 11.6% from 18 to 24, 32.6% from 25 to 44, 18.0% from 45 to 64, and 10.8% who were 65 years of age or older. The median age was 31 years. For every 100 females, there were 102.5 males. For every 100 females age 18 and over, there were 101.1 males.

The median income for a household in the city was $40,457, and the median income for a family was $44,953. Males had a median income of $30,265 versus $22,889 for females. The per capita income for the city was $17,970. About 11.7% of families and 17.2% of the population were below the poverty line, including 28.7% of those under age 18 and 12.8% of those age 65 or over.

Sports
Two minor league baseball teams in the Western Carolinas League were based in Monroe.  The  Monroe Indians played in the city in 1969, while the Monroe Pirates played there in 1971.

Media
The local newspaper is The Enquirer-Journal, which is published three days a week (Wednesday, Friday and Sunday).

The local radio stations are WIXE 1190 AM radio and WDZD 99.1 FM.

Transportation
U.S. Route 74 runs east-west through Monroe; U.S. Route 601 runs north-south through the city. 

The Seaboard Air Line Railroad ran multiple passenger trains a day on the Raleigh-Athens-Atlanta route through Monroe, including the Silver Comet (New York-Birmingham). The SAL also operated Charlotte (SAL station)-Hamlet-Wilmington passenger trains, also making stops in Monroe. This Charlotte-Wilmington service ended in 1958. The last train was the Silver Comet, ending service in October, 1969.  Trains used to stop at the Seaboard Air Line Railroad depot.

Notable people

 Adrian Autry, retired professional basketball player who is currently the associate head coach for the Syracuse Orange
 Terry Baucom, banjoist
 Thomas Walter Bickett, 54th Governor of North Carolina (1917–1921)
 Skipper Bowles, politician
 Walter P. Carter, civil rights activist
 Gil Coan, Major League Baseball player
 David L. Cook, seven-time Emmy Award-winning recording artist
 Grover Covington, Canadian Football Hall of Famer
 Jamison Crowder, NFL wide receiver for New York Jets
 Carlo Curley, classical organist
 Christine Darden, aeronautical engineer at NASA; first African-American woman at agency promoted to Senior Executive Service, top rank of federal civil service
 Theodore L. Futch, Brigadier general in the United States Army during World War II
 JoJo Hailey, R&B and soul singer-songwriter
 K-ci Hailey, R&B and soul singer-songwriter
 Jesse Helms, U.S. Senator
 Richard Huntley, former NFL running back
 Carroll McCray, NCAA head football coach of Gardner-Webb University
 Jeff McNeely, Major League Baseball player
 James W. Nance, U.S. Navy officer, 10th Deputy National Security Advisor (1981–1982)
 John J. Parker, U.S. judge who served on tribunal of Nuremberg Trials
 Samuel I. Parker, recipient of the Medal of Honor for his actions during World War I
 Aaron W. Plyler, politician and businessman
 Mike Pope, former NFL tight end coach
 Calvin Richardson, R&B and soul singer-songwriter
 Speedy Thompson, former NASCAR driver
 Andy Tomberlin, Major League Baseball player
 John Tsitouris, Major League Baseball pitcher
 Paul Waggoner, guitarist for Between the Buried and Me
 Robert F. Williams, civil rights activist
 Scott Williams, serial killer
 Terry Witherspoon, former NFL fullback

References

External links

 
 
 Official website of Monroe Economic Development

Cities in North Carolina
Cities in Union County, North Carolina
County seats in North Carolina
Populated places established in 1843
1843 establishments in North Carolina